Kochu Kochu Santhoshangal is a 2000 Indian Malayalam-language family drama film written and directed by Sathyan Anthikkad from a story by C. V. Balakrishnan. It stars Jayaram, Lakshmi Gopalaswamy, Kalidas Jayaram, Innocent and Kavya Madhavan. It marked the on-screen debut of Kalidas. The music was composed by Ilaiyaraaja. The film won two National Film Awards—Best Feature Film in Malayalam and Best Choreography (for Kala).

Plot

Gopan a single father living with his six-year-old son Achu in Goa works in a petrol pump and as an occasional tourist photographer. A teenager Celin, his neighbour falls in love with him forcing Gopan to reveal that Achu's mother Asha Lakshmi is alive and how they were separated.

Gopan and Asha had a run-away marriage as Asha is from a rich family while Gopan is just a videographer at a local studio. Asha, an admired classical dance artist prior to her marriage, left her career to lead a life with Gopan, becoming a simple housewife. After Achu's birth Maya Varma, a famous classical dance artist, learns of Asha's talent and asks her to join her dance troupe.

Asha's aspiring career starts to conflict with the peaceful life she had with Gopan and their child; this, fueled by tensions between Gopan and Asha's father, results in Gopan leaving with his son, thinking that it would benefit her life and career.

Gopan meets Maya in Goa accidentally but she acts as if she didn't recognize him. Few days later Celin brings Maya to Gopan who reveals that Asha never danced again after Gopan left with his son. Gopan and Asha reunite on the advice of Maya that there should be a balance between art and family life.

Cast
Jayaram as Gopan
Kalidas Jayaram as Ashok Gopan  Achu
Lakshmi Gopalaswamy as Asha Lakshmi (voiced by Bhagyalakshmi)
Innocent as Jose
Kavya Madhavan as Celin (voiced by Sreeja Ravi)
Bhanupriya as Maya Varma
Lalu Alex as Ashok
Siddique as Ramesh
Lena as Deepa
Kalabhavan Mani as Sudhakaran
Urmila Unni as Vilasini
K. P. A. C. Lalitha as Jagadhamma
Oduvil Unnikrishnan as Shekaran
Mala Aravindan as Sankaran
Augustine as Mathews
Thesni Khan as herself
Valsala Menon as Asha's grandmother
Yamuna as Elizabeth
Babu Swamy as Andrews

Production
Jayaram signed into play the male lead along with his son Kalidas Jayaram marking his debut as an actor. It was K. P. A. C. Lalitha who suggested the name of Kalidas for the film. For the female lead role, Meenakshi Sheshadri was considered but Lakshmi Gopalaswamy was eventually signed for the role. Bollywood actress Hema Malini had signed to play another important role but was replaced by South Indian actress Bhanupriya. Samyuktha Varma signed into play the role of Celine but opted out due to prior commitments, and later Sukanya was considered for the role and finally Kavya Madhavan played the role. The film was shot in Panaji, Goa.

Soundtrack

Accolades

References

External links 
 

2000s Malayalam-language films
2000 films
2000s romance films
Films with screenplays by Sathyan Anthikad
Films directed by Sathyan Anthikad
Films scored by Ilaiyaraaja
Films featuring a Best Choreography National Film Award-winning choreography
Best Malayalam Feature Film National Film Award winners
Indian romance films